Dana Strong is an American business executive, and the CEO of Sky Group, a British media and telecommunications conglomerate. Previously, she was president of consumer services at Comcast Cable and held various roles at Liberty Global.

Early life
Born in Ohio, Strong holds a dual degree from the University of Pennsylvania with a Bachelor of Science in economics from the Wharton School of Business and a Bachelor of Arts in history from the College of Arts & Sciences.

Career
Strong joined Australian telecommunications firm Austar in 1999 and was appointed chief operating officer in 2002.

In January 2011, it was announced that Strong was to join UPC Ireland as CEO from May 2011.

Strong joined Virgin Media as COO in June 2013, and moved on to parent company Liberty Global as a senior vice-president and chief transformation officer in January 2015.

Strong joined Comcast Cable in January 2018 as president of consumer services.

Strong succeeded Jeremy Darroch as chief executive of Sky in January 2021.

References

American chief executives in the media industry
Wharton School of the University of Pennsylvania alumni
Living people
Comcast people
Sky Group
Year of birth missing (living people)